The New England Magazine was a monthly literary magazine published in Boston, Massachusetts, from 1884 to 1917. It was known as The Bay State Monthly from 1884 to 1886.

The magazine was published by J. N. McClinctock and Company.

The magazine has no connection to the 1830s publication The New-England Magazine.

References

The New England Magazine, Online Books Page

External links
The Bay State Monthly: PDF copies (Cornell University)
The New England Magazine (1886–1900): PDF copies (Cornell University)
New England magazine and Bay State monthly at the HathiTrust

Monthly magazines published in the United States
Defunct literary magazines published in the United States
Magazines established in 1884
Magazines disestablished in 1917
Magazines published in Boston